John Isner successfully defended his title by beating Tomáš Berdych 3–6, 6–4, 7–6(11–9) in the final.

Seeds
All seeds received a bye into the second round.

Draw

Finals

Top half

Section 1

Section 2

Bottom half

Section 3

Section 4

Qualifying

Seeds

Qualifiers

Draw

First qualifier

Second qualifier

Third qualifier

Fourth qualifier

References
Main Draw
 Qualifying Draw

Winston-Salem Open - Singles
2012 Singles